Toronto railway station is a former railway station located in the Lake Macquarie suburb of Toronto, the terminus of the former Fassifern - Toronto branch line in New South Wales, Australia.

The station closed on 11 March 1990. The line and station is still largely intact. The station building is an example of heritage re-use, now in use by the Lake Macquarie and District Historical Society.

Gallery

References

External links
 Toronto (NSWrail.net)

Disused regional railway stations in New South Wales
City of Lake Macquarie
Railway stations in the Hunter Region
Railway stations in Australia opened in 1891
Railway stations closed in 1990